John MacAndrews was a British actor of the silent era.

Selected filmography
 The Vicar of Wakefield (1913)
 The Heart of Midlothian (1914)
 The Chimes (1914)
 For Her People (1914)
 Far from the Madding Crowd (1915)
 Barnaby Rudge (1915)
 The Nightbirds of London (1915)
 The Bottle (1915)
 Molly Bawn (1916)
 A Place in the Sun (1916)
 Trelawny of the Wells (1916)
 The American Heiress (1917)
 Nearer My God to Thee (1917)
 A Gamble for Love (1917)
 The Man Behind 'The Times' (1917)
 The Hanging Judge (1918)
 The Poet's Windfall (1918)
 Boundary House (1918)
 The Nature of the Beast (1919)
 His Dearest Possession (1919)
 The Forest on the Hill (1919)
 Sunken Rocks (1919)
 The Kinsman (1919)
 Broken in the Wars (1919)
 Once Aboard the Lugger (1920)
Alf's Button (1920)
 John Forrest Finds Himself (1920)
 The Lunatic at Large (1921)
 The Bargain (1921)
 A Sister to Assist 'Er (1922)
 The White Hope (1922)
 Comin' Thro the Rye (1923)
 Mist in the Valley (1923)
 Strangling Threads (1923)
 What the Butler Saw (1924)
 The House of Marney (1926)

References

External links

Year of birth unknown
Year of death unknown
British male film actors
British male silent film actors
20th-century British male actors